Croatia competed in the Eurovision Song Contest 1999, held in Jerusalem. The Croatian entry for the contest was Doris Dragović with the song "Marija Magdalena".

The Croatian broadcaster Hrvatska radiotelevizija (HRT) held a national final, Dora, to select the Croatian entry for the contest.

Before Eurovision

Dora 1999 
The 1999 edition of Dora was held on 7 March at the HRT TV studios in Zagreb, hosted by Oliver Mlakar and Vlatka Pokos. 24 songs competed, with the winner decided by 21 juries, 20 regional juries and a 21st jury made up of televoting results. This was the first contest where an orchestra is introduced for the first time since Dora existed. Every entry has its own conductor, respectively as the arranger for the specific song. This existed until 2004.

The winner of the contest was Doris Dragović with "Marija Magdalena". Dragović had previously represented Yugoslavia, at the 1986 contest with the song "Željo moja".

At Eurovision
On the night of the contest Dragović performed 4th, following Spain and preceding the United Kingdom. The song received 118 points at the close of the voting (12 points from Slovenia and Spain), placing Croatia 4th of 23 countries competing. This was, and still is as of 2021, Croatia's joint-best placing at the contest, sharing with Croatia's 1996 entry, "Sveta ljubav" with Maja Blagdan. Only Denmark, Norway and the United Kingdom failed to award the song any points at all.

Voting

After Eurovision
The Norwegian delegation raised an objection to the use of simulated male vocals during the performance of Croatian entry "Marija Magdalena". Following the contest this was found to have contravened the contest rules regarding the use of vocals on the backing tracks, and Croatia were sanctioned by the EBU with the loss of 33% of their points for the purpose of calculating their average points total for qualification in following contests. The country's position and points at this contest however remain unchanged.

References

Bibliography 
 
 

1999
Countries in the Eurovision Song Contest 1999
Eurovision